Elymnias cybele is a butterfly in the family Nymphalidae. It was described by Cajetan Felder and Rudolf Felder in 1860. It is found in the Australasian realm.

Subspecies
E. c. cybele (Bachan, Ternate, Halmahera)
E. c. obiana Fruhstorfer, 1904 (Obi)
E. c. thryallis Kirsch, 1877 (Waigeu, Mioswar Island, North New Guinea)

References

External links
"Elymnias Hübner, 1818" at Markku Savela's Lepidoptera and Some Other Life Forms

Elymnias
Butterflies described in 1860
Taxa named by Baron Cajetan von Felder
Taxa named by Rudolf Felder